Aguilcourt—Variscourt halt (French: Halte d'Aguilcourt—Variscourt) is a railway halt located in the commune of Variscourt, Aisne department in northern France. The halt also serves the nearby commune of Aguilcourt. It is located at kilometric point (KP) 18.187 on the Reims—Laon railway and served by TER Grand Est trains operated by the SNCF. 

In 2018, the SNCF estimated that the halt served 6,155 passengers.

Gallery

See also 

 List of SNCF stations in Hauts-de-France

References 

Railway stations in Aisne